Dinç Bilgin (born 1940) is a Turkish businessman who built up a media empire which was voluntarily handed over to the Turkish government in 2008 over alleged financial irregularities relating to Etibank. These companies were later sold by TMSF for $ 1.1 Billion. He founded a number of newspapers including Sabah (1985) and Takvim (1994), and a number of television stations, including ATV (1993). He also founded the now-defunct Ateş and Yeni Yüzyıl in 1995, selling them to Korkmaz Yiğit in 1998.

Career
Bilgin began his career at Yeni Asır. He founded a number of newspapers including Sabah (1985) and Takvim (1994), and a number of television stations, including ATV (1993). He also founded the now-defunct Ateş and Yeni Yüzyıl in 1995, selling them to Korkmaz Yiğit in 1998.

Etibank was privatised on 2 March 1998 to Medya İpek Holding A.Ş., co-owned by Bilgin and Cavit Çağlar, for $155m. The bank was sold to Bilgin's Medya Sabah Holding A.Ş. in 2000. It was taken over by the government's TMSF in October 2000. In 2011, Bilgin was sentenced to nearly five years in prison for financial irregularities relating to his ownership of Etibank.

References

https://www.hurriyet.com.tr/ekonomi/sabah-atv-ye-1-1-milyar-dolar-verdi-sonuna-kadar-variz-dedi-7818704

1940 births
Living people
Turkish newspaper chain founders
Yeni Yüzyıl people